Wickham is a municipality located in the Centre-du-Québec region of Quebec. The population as of the Canada 2011 Census was 2,470.

Demographics

Population
Population trend:

Language
Mother tongue language (2006)

See also
List of municipalities in Quebec

References

Municipalities in Quebec
Incorporated places in Centre-du-Québec